"Easy" is a song by indie pop band Pale Waves. Released 13 January 2021, it served as the third single from their second studio album, Who Am I?

Music and lyrics
"Easy" was written by Pale Waves's guitarist and lyricist, Heather Baron-Gracie along with Sam de Jong; it was produced by Rich Costey. According to Baron-Gracie, "Easy" is the "feel good love song" on the album. "I feel like love is the most universal and most powerful emotion we experience," Baron-Gracie later explained in an interview with Apple Music. "Love can drive you to do crazy things [and "Easy" is] about how euphoric and uplifting love made me feel."

Originally this track was envisioned as a piano ballad, but "it didn't fit together". Despite optimistic lyrics, "on the piano, it ... sound[ed] sad and a bit depressing." When Baron-Gracie showcased the song for de Jong, the latter told her: "I love this song, but the music doesn't really suit what [you are] talking about, nor does it entirely represent the true meaning of 'easy'." Baron-Gracie and de Jong consequently reworked the song, metamorphosing it from a "depressing emo ballad" into an "uplifting, feel-good song". One element that was added to the song at this time was the heavier guitar riff that plays during the chorus. This riff was inspired by "grungy, super-catchy" guitar lines in songs by "strong female artists" like Courtney Love, Alanis Morissette, and Liz Phair. Initially, Baron-Gracie and de Jong debated whether the riff belonged in the final cut, but in the end, Baron-Gracie felt that it added "another element" to the song.

Music video

A video for "Easy" was released on 13 January 2021. Directed by James Slater, this video was inspired by the "gothic medieval aesthetic and ... Tim Burton films", according to Baron-Gracie. , the video has been viewed over 1.91 million times on YouTube.

Release and reception
"Easy" was released as the third single from Who Am I?, and it debuted on 13 January 2021, premiering on BBC Radio 1. The song later peaked at number 43 on Radiomonitors "UK Radio Airplay Top 50" chart.

Personnel
Credits adapted from the liner notes of Who Am I?Pale Waves Heather Baron-Gracie – vocals, guitar
 Ciara Doran – drums, synths, programming
 Hugo Silvani – guitar
 Charlie Wood – bass guitarTechnical'
 Rich Costey – production
 Koby Berman – additional production
 Ciara Doran – additional production

Charts

Release history

References

2021 songs
British pop punk songs
Dirty Hit singles
Pale Waves songs
Songs written by Sam de Jong
Song recordings produced by Rich Costey
Songs written by Heather Baron-Gracie